Geneva is a Germanic female given name, which means "juniper tree". Geneva is an obscure name. Less than 200 babies in the United States are named Geneva every year. The name Geneva was most popular in the 1920s, and made up almost 0.002%  of birth names. Today, there are approximately 43,567 people named Geneva in the US. The most common age group with the name Geneva is 84 years.

The name Geneva may refer to:

Geneva Carr (born 1971), American actress
Geneva Cruz (born 1976), Filipino singer
Geneva Mercer (1889–1984), American artist 
Geneva Mitchell (1907–1949), American actress
Geneva Overholser (born 1948), American journalist

References

 

Germanic given names
Germanic feminine given names